The 1998 Direct Line International Championships was a tennis tournament played on grass courts at the Devonshire Park Lawn Tennis Club in Eastbourne in the United Kingdom that was part of Tier II of the 1998 WTA Tour. The tournament was held from 15 June until 20 June 1998. First-seeded Jana Novotná won the singles title.

Finals

Singles

 Jana Novotná defeated  Arantxa Sánchez-Vicario 6–1, 7–5
 It was Novotná's second singles title of the year and the 21st of her career.

Doubles

 Mariaan de Swardt /  Jana Novotná defeated  Arantxa Sánchez-Vicario /  Natasha Zvereva 6–1, 6–3
 It was de Swardt's only doubles title of the year and the third of her career. It was Novotná's third doubles title of the year and the 71st of her career.

References

External links
 ITF Tournament Profile

Direct Line International Championships
Eastbourne International
1998 in English women's sport
June 1998 sports events in the United Kingdom
1998 in English tennis